Yellow bumblebee is a common name for several insects and may refer to:

Bombus auricomus
Bombus fervidus
Bombus flavifrons

Animal common name disambiguation pages